James Clinkscales Hill (January 8, 1924 – March 31, 2017) was a United States circuit judge of the United States Court of Appeals for the Fifth Circuit and of the United States Court of Appeals for the Eleventh Circuit and previously was a United States district judge of the United States District Court for the Northern District of Georgia.

Education and career

Born in Darlington, South Carolina, Hill was in the United States Army Air Corps during World War II, from 1943 to 1945. He received a Juris Doctor from Emory University School of Law in 1948 and a Bachelor of Science degree from the University of South Carolina in 1948. He was in private practice in Atlanta, Georgia from 1948 to 1974.

Federal judicial service

Hill was nominated by President Richard Nixon on July 9, 1974, to a seat on the United States District Court for the Northern District of Georgia vacated by Judge Sidney Oslin Smith Jr. He was confirmed by the United States Senate on August 8, 1974, and received his commission on August 9, 1974. His service was terminated on May 26, 1976, due to elevation to the Fifth Circuit.

Hill was nominated by President Gerald Ford on May 4, 1976, to a seat on the United States Court of Appeals for the Fifth Circuit vacated by Judge Griffin Bell. He was confirmed by the Senate on May 19, 1976, and received his commission on May 21, 1976. Hill was reassigned by operation of law to the United States Court of Appeals for the Eleventh Circuit on October 1, 1981. He assumed senior status on October 15, 1989, serving in that status until his death on March 31, 2017, in Stuart, Florida.

References

Sources
 

1924 births
2017 deaths
20th-century American judges
Judges of the United States Court of Appeals for the Eleventh Circuit
Judges of the United States Court of Appeals for the Fifth Circuit
Judges of the United States District Court for the Northern District of Georgia
People from Darlington, South Carolina
United States Army Air Forces personnel of World War II
United States court of appeals judges appointed by Gerald Ford
United States district court judges appointed by Richard Nixon